Anthony Omarian Joshua Hinds (born 29 March 2003) is an English professional footballer who plays as a forward for Bradford (Park Avenue), on loan from EFL Championship club Hull City.

Career
A youth product of West Ham United, Hinds moved to the Hull City youth academy in 2019 at the U18 level. He made his professional debut with Hull City in a 0–0 EFL Championship tie with Bournemouth on 28 August 2021. On 19 November 2021, Hinds moved on a month-long loan to Spalding United. The loan was expected to be extended but on  
30 December 2021 he was recalled by Hull City.

On 18 March 2022, Hinds moved on a month-long loan spell to Gainsborough Trinity.

On 4 November 2022, Hinds joined National League North side Boston United on a one-month loan deal.

On 17 February 2023, Hinds joined National League North side Bradford (Park Avenue) on a month-long loan spell.

Career statistics

References

External links
 
 Hull City Profile

2003 births
Living people
Footballers from Essex
English footballers
Hull City A.F.C. players
Spalding United F.C. players
Gainsborough Trinity F.C. players
Boston United F.C. players
Bradford (Park Avenue) A.F.C. players
English Football League players
National League (English football) players
Association football forwards